WBTW (channel 13) is a television station licensed to Florence, South Carolina, United States, serving the Pee Dee and Grand Strand regions of South Carolina as an affiliate of CBS. The station is owned by Nexstar Media Group, and maintains studios on McDonald Court in the unincorporated community of Socastee (but with a Myrtle Beach postal address); its transmitter is located near Dillon, South Carolina (across from the tower of ABC affiliate WPDE-TV, channel 15).

History
The station went on the air on October 18, 1954 on VHF channel 8 from a transmitter at its original studios on TV Road in the Back Swamp section north of the town of Quinby (though with a Florence address). It was owned by Jefferson Standard Life Insurance Company (later becoming Jefferson-Pilot, now part of Lincoln Financial Group). It was Jefferson Standard's second television station behind WBTV in Charlotte, North Carolina. WBTW's call sign was derived from "W" being the next letter in the alphabet after "V". The two stations were programmed separately, but shared a microwave system built in 1959. On September 17, 1962, it moved to VHF channel 13, while its previous channel was re-allocated to High Point, North Carolina as WGHP.

Jefferson Standard sold the station to the Shott family of Bluefield, West Virginia, publishers of the Bluefield Daily Telegraph and owners of WHIS-AM-FM-TV in Bluefield through the Daily Telegraph Publishing Company, in 1968. The move came because WBTV and WBTW had a fairly significant grade B signal overlap, and neither station would have been able to expand its signal if Jefferson Standard had kept them both. During WBTW ownership by the Shott family, the station often used local radio personalities to deliver news, sports and weather. Regular talent included Jim (James) Griffin and Gene Allen.

In 1979, WBTW activated its current tower on Pee Dee Church Road in rural Dillon County, southeast of the county seat of Dillon south of South Carolina Highway 9. This more than doubled its coverage area, giving it at least secondary coverage as far north as Fayetteville, Raeford and Pinehurst; as far west as Polkton and Pageland; as far south as Georgetown and Summerton and as far east as Leland and Elizabethtown. Only local cable systems in Fayetteville and Pinehurst do not currently carry WBTW, but did until the 1980s and early-1990s.

For many years, it was the only commercial television station located between Wilmington and Charleston. This was because of a quirk in the Federal Communications Commission (FCC)'s allocation of VHF channels. Most markets got at least two VHF allocations. However, Florence–Myrtle Beach is sandwiched between Raleigh–Durham (channels 4, 5, and 11) and Wilmington (channels 3 and 6) to the north, Charleston (channels 2, 4, 5, and 7) to the south, and Columbia (channel 10) and Charlotte (channels 3 and 9) to the west. This created a "doughnut" in northeastern South Carolina where there could be only one VHF license.

The station has always been a CBS affiliate, but carried some ABC shows until WPDE-TV (channel 15) signed-on in 1980. The Shotts sold most of their media holdings in 1984, with their two remaining television stations, WBTW and KIMT in Mason City, Iowa going to Spartanburg-based Spartan Radiocasting Corporation (later Spartan Communications), the founding owners of fellow CBS affiliate WSPA-TV. In the late-1980s and early-1990s, it branded itself on-air as the "Best of Two Worlds" playing off the "BTW" in its call letters. In 2000, Spartan merged with Media General.

From 1995 to 2000, WBTW served as the de facto CBS affiliate for parts of the Wilmington market because former affiliate WJKA-TV switched to Fox and became WSFX-TV. That market got another CBS affiliate in 2000 when WILM-LP (now WILM-LD) picked up the affiliation. However, WBTW still served some parts of the Wilmington area that did not receive the low-powered WILM signal over-the-air or on cable. This ended in 2017 when WWAY acquired the CBS affiliation for its second digital subchannel. After being known as "TV 13" for most of its history, this station re-branded itself as "News 13" in 2002. WBTW's broadcasts became digital-only, effective June 12, 2009.

On May 2, 2011, a letter was submitted to the FCC requesting that WBTW be authorized to abandon its channel 13 frequency (213 MHz) and move to channel 41 (635 MHz), and transmit a non-directional signal with a strength of 1 million watts—equivalent to 5 million watts in analog (it is 316,000 watts on channel 13). The letter also requested that the height of the transmitter elements on the tower be the same as now on channel 13. This was never acted upon by the FCC and WBTW remains on channel 13.

On January 27, 2016, Media General announced that it had entered into a definite agreement to be acquired by Nexstar Broadcasting Group for $4.6 billion. The combined company would be called Nexstar Media Group and own 171 stations (including WBTW). The deal was completed on January 17, 2017.

Programming

Syndicated programming
Syndicated programming on WBTW includes Dr. Phil, Jeopardy!, and Wheel of Fortune (co-hosted by North Myrtle Beach native Vanna White).

News operation
Historically, WBTW was one of the most dominant stations in the country. This is in part because it was the only station in the market for a quarter-century; until WPDE signed on in 1980, viewers had to rely on cable to get programming from the other networks. The ratings have tightened with more competition, but WBTW continues to lead.

In 2004, WBTW established a news share agreement with Fox affiliate WFXB. It then began producing a weeknight 10 o'clock newscast for that station known as Fox 43 News at 10. In 2006, the title switched to Fox News at 10.

During August 2007, WBTW became the second station in the market to move most of its operations to new studios in Myrtle Beach. A smaller facility at that same site had been serving as the station's Grand Strand bureau since 1989; it was demolished in 2007 to make way for the larger facility. The station maintained some operations its old facilities in Florence for a time. However, by 2008 the station had moved all of its operations to Myrtle Beach. A physical Lumberton bureau closed in 2007. Like the other two stations in the market, it has kept a small team of reporters in Florence to cover the inland portion of the market.

In March 2008, WBTW converted its news operation to all-digital. The revamp included new graphics, new news set, and robotic studio cameras. In 2013, WBTW became the second station in the market (after NBC affiliate WMBF, which signed on in HD) to broadcast its newscasts in high definition. This left ABC affiliate WPDE as the last local news station to still broadcast in enhanced digital widescreen (until 2015).

On December 1, 2011, WBTW began producing an hour-long weekday morning show on WFXB. Known as Fox Morning News, the broadcast is seen from 7 until 8 offering a local alternative to the big three network morning shows. On May 19, 2012, WBTW launched an hour-long newscast on Saturday and Sunday mornings from 8–9 a.m.

On April 20, 2015, WBTW began producing a half-hour extension to its morning newscast at 4:30 a.m., as well as an hour-long 9:00 a.m. newscast titled News 13 NOW. The newscasts are the only ones on at that time in the Florence/Myrtle Beach market, and as a result, WBTW 13 produces five and a half hours of weekday morning news, with two of those hours produced for WFXB.

On September 10, 2018, WBTW debuted a 5:30 p.m. newscast, with Inside Edition moving to WMBF-TV in the same timeslot, which moved its 5:30 p.m. newscast to 7:30 p.m.

Notable former staff
 Darby Mullany Dunn – anchor (1993–1997; later at CNN; now reporter at CNBC)
 Kellie Rasberry – weekend weather and reporter (1990–1994) now on-air personality at The Kidd Kraddick Morning Show.

Subchannels
The station's digital signal is multiplexed:

On September 5, 2006, WBTW launched a new subchannel branded as My TV, carrying programming from MyNetworkTV and Retro TV. It is carried on Spectrum digital channel 1215, on HTC Cablevision channel 99 in Conway, and previously in Brunswick County, North Carolina on ATMC channel 73. In 2011, RTV was replaced with Antenna TV and the subchannel was rebranded as WBTW 13.2.

Cable and satellite coverage outside of the DMA
During the CATV period of the 1970s and 1980s, WBTW had even more significant coverage in North Carolina. It was once carried in Anson (Wadesboro system), Montgomery, Moore and Lee counties. As of 2011, it was only carried in Polkton (Anson County), the counties of Richmond, Hoke, and parts of Columbus and Brunswick. Most of WBTW's out-of-market carriage has since ended. WBTW is not carried on satellite outside of the market.

Anson and Richmond counties are within the Charlotte DMA (served by WBTV), while Hoke and Moore counties are in the Raleigh–Durham DMA (served by sister station WNCN) and Montgomery is the only county served by WBTW that is within the Greensboro DMA (served by WFMY-TV).

References

External links

CBS network affiliates
Antenna TV affiliates
Ion Television affiliates
Ion Mystery affiliates
Television channels and stations established in 1954
1954 establishments in South Carolina
BTW
Nexstar Media Group